Michael Dante DiMartino (born July 18, 1974) is an American animator, producer, writer, and director. He is best known, together with Bryan Konietzko, as the co-creator of the animated TV series Avatar: The Last Airbender and The Legend of Korra, both on Nickelodeon.

Career 
Before Avatar, DiMartino worked for twelve years at Film Roman, helping to direct King of the Hill, Family Guy and Mission Hill, in addition to his own animated short, Atomic Love, which was screened at a number of high-profile film festivals. The dedication to his father's memory can be seen in the penultimate episode of Avatar: The Last Airbender. In a 2010 interview the president of Nickelodeon, Cyma Zarghami, confirmed that DiMartino and Konietzko were developing a new series for the network, called The Legend of Korra. The series premiered on April 14, 2012, running 12 episodes for the first book "Air" and 14 for the second book "Spirits", which premiered on September 13, 2013, to 2.60 million viewers in the U.S., then the third book "Change" and the fourth and final book "Balance" of 13 episodes each.

On October 4, 2016, DiMartino released a new original novel, Rebel Genius. The story features a 12-year-old protagonist, Giacomo, who discovers he has a magical 'Genius,' the living embodiment of an artist's creative spirit, in a world where artistic expression is outlawed.

In September 2018, it was announced that Konietzko and DiMartino would serve as executive producers and showrunners for Netflix's upcoming live-action adaptation series of Avatar: The Last Airbender. On August 12, 2020, Konietzko and DiMartino revealed on social media that they've both departed the show, due to creative differences with the Netflix team.

In February 2021, ViacomCBS (the parent company of Nickelodeon) announced its formation of Avatar Studios, a division of Nickelodeon centered on developing newer animated series and movies set in the same universe as Avatar: The Last Airbender and The Legend of Korra with both DiMartino and Konietzko helming the studio as co-chief creative officers reporting to Nickelodeon Animation Studio president, Ramsey Ann Naito. Its first project will be an animated theatrical film which is set to start production later the same year.

Personal life 
DiMartino was born in Shelburne, Vermont. He studied at the Rhode Island School of Design with Bryan Konietzko, with whom he created Avatar.

Filmography

References

External links 
 
 Official Website
 Official Tumblr
  Interview with Mike and Bryan at AvatarSpirit.Net
 Rebel Genius on Fierce Reads

Animators from Vermont
American film producers
American animated film directors
American animated film producers
Place of birth missing (living people)
American male screenwriters
Living people
People from Shelburne, Vermont
Rhode Island School of Design alumni
1974 births
Screenwriters from Vermont
American cartoonists
Nickelodeon Animation Studio people
Showrunners